The next Arunachal Pradesh Legislative Assembly election is scheduled to be held in or before April 2024 along with next Indian general election.

Background 
The tenure of Arunachal Pradesh Legislative Assembly is scheduled to end on 2 June 2024. The previous assembly elections were held in April 2019. After the election, Bharatiya Janata Party formed the state government, with Pema Khandu becoming the Chief Minister.

Schedule

Parties and alliances



Others

References

State Assembly elections in Arunachal Pradesh
A